Michael Anthony Philipson (born 9 May 1986) is an Australian cricketer. He has previously represented Queensland in the Sheffield Shield.

References

1986 births
Australian cricketers
Queensland cricketers
Living people